Bandhuvulostunnaru Jagratha is a 1989 Indian Telugu-language comedy film directed by Sarath. It stars Rajendra Prasad and Rajani, with music composed by Chakravarthy. The film was a box office hit.

Plot
Chittibabu (Rajendra Prasad) is an orphan, who always yearned for the company and loves to have a family. Once he visits his best friend Sudhakar's (Subhalekha Sudhakar) sister's marriage where he falls for his cousin Satya (Rajani) and marries her. There onwards, his lifestyle completely changes his heart filled with joy and excitement about getting relatives. After some time, Chittibabu becomes host to Satya's extended family. In the beginning, he likes their company, but soon they become overbearing. The rest of the story is a comic tale that how Chittibabu cleverly way to rid themselves of their guests who overstays their welcome.

Cast

Rajendra Prasad as Chittibabu
Rajani as Seeta
Satyanarayana as Subba Rao
Kota Srinivasa Rao as Surayya
Gollapudi Maruti Rao 
Subhalekha Sudhakar as Sudhakar 
Suthi Velu as Kistayya
Brahmanandam as Bandhu Murthy
Raavi Kondala Rao
Vennira Aadai Moorthy as Yeddirajula Naidu
Chitti Babu as Chittibabu's friend
Potti Prasad as Chittibabu's friend
Satti Babu as Sarveswara Rao
Suryakantham as Sundaramma
Annapurna as Annapurna 
Sri Lakshmi as Lakshmi
Radha Kumari
Tatineni Rajeswari as Seetamma
Kalpana Rai as Mary / Mangatayaru
Y. Vijaya as Baby

Soundtrack
Music composed by Chakravarthy. Lyrics were written by Veturi.

References

External links

1980s Telugu-language films
1989 comedy films
1989 films
Films directed by Sarath
Films scored by K. Chakravarthy
Indian comedy films